American United Entertainment also known as (American United Media) is a film production entertainment company with divisions in production, distribution, finance, film and television. IFA Distribution is a film distribution and International sales subsidiary of American United Entertainment. American United Entertainment was founded by Robert John Rodriguez in 2011.

Overview
In 2016, American United Entertainment partnered with Han Capital Management on a $200 Million Dollar Fund for North American film and television projects.

In 2014 AUE produced and financed Bullet, starring Danny Trejo as the title character and Jonathan Banks as the villain.

In 2011, American United Entertainment started IFA Distribution and formed key strategic joint ventures with Intandem Films and Funimation Entertainment where they distributed films globally. In February 2011, AUE created a film financing fund (Feature Film Partners VII) Yahoo Finance[3] with former chairman and chief executive officer of Fox Filmed Entertainment, Bill Mechanic CEO of Pandemonium Films.

Filmography

References

External links
 

Film production companies of the United States
Film distributors of the United States
Companies based in Los Angeles
Mass media companies established in 2011
2011 establishments in California
American companies established in 2011